Lamine Gassama (born 20 October 1989) is a Senegalese professional footballer who plays as a right back for Swiss club Lausanne-Ouchy and the Senegal national team.

Career

Early career
Gassama grew up in the neighbourhood of La Castellane in the city of Marseille. He began his career playing for FC Martigues, just north of his hometown. After spending two years in the youth system, he returned to Marseille and joined local club Aubagne FC. There, he caught the attention of Olympique Lyonnais and joined the club's academy the following year.

Lyon
Before the start of the 2008–09 season, Gassama was promoted to the first-team squad participating in Lyon's pre-season tour. He appeared in all five matches including starts against Nîmes Olympique, Rapid București, and AS Nancy. On 2 September 2008, it was announced by Lyon that Gassama had signed a professional contract keeping him with the champions until 2011. He made his professional football debut on 29 October 2008 against FC Sochaux-Montbéliard starting in the right back position. The match resulted in a 2–0 victory with Gassama playing the full 90 minutes.

Gassama made seven league appearances, and also made his debut in the UEFA Champions League starting Lyon's final group stage match against Bayern Munich, with his primary responsibility being to contain fellow Frenchman and the much more experienced Franck Ribéry. The matchup, in the end, was unquestionably in Ribéry's favor, as Lyon lost the match 2–3 with the French talisman being involved in two of Bayern's goals and Gassama being substituted out in the 64th minute.

Lorient
On 26 January 2012, Gassama joined Lorient on a free transfer, after Olympique Lyonnais decided not to extend his contract.

Lausanne-Ouchy
On 11 July 2022, Gassama signed with Lausanne-Ouchy in Switzerland.

International career
Gassama made no appearances with any of France's youth squads. However, due to his performances with Lyon, he received a surprise call-up to the under-21 squad, who were looking to start fresh after their elimination from the 2009 UEFA European Under-21 Football Championship, for a friendly against Denmark. He made his under-21 debut in that match starting the match in the right back position before being subbed out in the 82nd minute. France would go on to win the match 1–0.

In May 2011, it was confirmed that Gassama would be representing Senegal at senior international level. He made his debut on 10 August 2011 in a 0–2 friendly home defeat against Morocco.

In May 2018 he was named in Senegal's 23-man squad for the 2018 FIFA World Cup in Russia.

Career statistics

Club

Honours

Individual
Africa Cup of Nations Team of the Tournament: 2019

International

References

External links

1989 births
Footballers from Marseille
Black French sportspeople
French sportspeople of Senegalese descent
French sportspeople of Guinean descent
Senegalese people of Guinean descent
Citizens of Senegal through descent
Living people
French footballers
France youth international footballers
France under-21 international footballers
Senegalese footballers
Senegal international footballers
Association football fullbacks
Olympique Lyonnais players
FC Lorient players
Alanyaspor footballers
Göztepe S.K. footballers
CE Sabadell FC footballers
FC Stade Lausanne Ouchy players
Ligue 1 players
Süper Lig players
Primera Federación players
Swiss Challenge League players
2011 CAF U-23 Championship players
2015 Africa Cup of Nations players
2017 Africa Cup of Nations players
2018 FIFA World Cup players
2019 Africa Cup of Nations players
Senegalese expatriate footballers
Expatriate footballers in Turkey
Senegalese expatriate sportspeople in Turkey
Expatriate footballers in Spain
Senegalese expatriate sportspeople in Spain
Expatriate footballers in Switzerland
Senegalese expatriate sportspeople in Switzerland